LIMF may refer to:

 Liverpool International Music Festival
 London International Mime Festival
 Turin Airport, by ICAO airport code

See also
 Lim (f)